Gyeongin National University of Education Station is located at Gyeyang district of Incheon metropolitan city in South Korea. The station was opened in 1999 of which the name was Incheon National university of education station. In 2003, the term was changed following the alteration of university. The university changed its name into Gyeongin National University of Education.

Station layout

Exits

Ridership

References 

Seoul Metropolitan Subway stations
Metro stations in Incheon
Railway stations opened in 1999
Gyeyang District